Khursheed KA Marker (21 November 1925 – 11 December 2010) was a Pakistani businessman and former caretaker minister. He was the Minister of Water and Power in Qureshi caretaker ministry in 1993.

Early life and education
Marker was born in Quetta on 21 November 1925. He received his early education from The Doon School in the Indian state of Uttarakhan. He then completed his graduation from the University of Cambridge.

References

1925 births
2010 deaths
Federal ministers of Pakistan
Pakistani Zoroastrians
Parsi people
People from Quetta
The Doon School alumni
Alumni of the University of Cambridge